Area codes 718, 347, and 929 are telephone area codes in the North American Numbering Plan (NANP) for the New York City boroughs of the Bronx, Brooklyn, Queens, and Staten Island, as well as the Marble Hill section of Manhattan. They are part of a larger overlay plan with area code 917, which comprises all of New York City.

History
For the first 37 years after the establishment of the North American Numbering Plan in 1947, all of New York City was a single numbering plan area (NPA), area code 212. In 1984, New York Telephone asked the New York Public Service Commission to split part of New York City into a new area code to "prevent an impending exhaustion of telephone numbers." On February 1, 1984, the commission voted to split serve Brooklyn, Queens, and Staten Island into a new area code, with Manhattan and the Bronx retaining 212. The announcement of the impending split triggered protests and threats of legal action from local officials and lawmakers representing the outer boroughs. Despite this, New York Telephone implemented the new 718 area code on September 1, 1984. The split was implemented in a way that split the city's three million telephone numbers roughly in half. Permissive dialing of 212 continued across New York City until January 1, 1985.

On July 1, 1992, the Bronx and the neighborhood of Marble Hill, Manhattan were also split from numbering plan area 212, and were added to 718. A permissive dialing period for using either area code 212 or 718 in the affected area lasted until May 16, 1993.

On October 1, 1999, area code 347 was added as an overlay code to area code 718.

On December 16, 2009, the New York Public Service Commission approved an additional overlay code for the 718/347 numbering plan area. On January 22, 2010, NeuStar announced another overlay code (929) for the New York City 718 and 347 area codes used by boroughs outside Manhattan. Area code 929 became effective on April 16, 2011. This had the effect of assigning 23.4 million numbers to an area of 6.7 million people.

As of October 2021, NPA 347/718/929 has a projected exhaustion date of the second quarter of 2028.

Area code 917 overlays area codes 718, 347, and 929, as well as area codes 212, 646 and 332 in Manhattan.

Marble Hill

Despite being legally a part of the borough of Manhattan, per the Greater New York Charter of 1897, the neighborhood of Marble Hill is excluded from the Manhattan numbering plan areas 212, 646, and 332, instead using the 718, 347, and 929 area codes. It used to be attached to Manhattan Island. After the Harlem River Ship Canal was built in 1895, Marble Hill was separated from Manhattan Island by water. Soon after, the Spuyten Duyvil Creek was filled in with landfill, physically connecting Marble Hill to the Bronx.

When the 718 numbering plan area was extended to the Bronx, Marble Hill residents unsuccessfully fought to retain area code 212. Marble Hill receives its dial tone from central offices in the Bronx, and it would have been too expensive for New York Telephone to reroute Marble Hill's trunk so that it could remain in 212.

In popular culture
The 718 area code was celebrated in the 1998 2 Skinnee J's song "718", in which the rappers tell of people moving from Manhattan (212) to other boroughs (718) for lower rent.

Area codes 212 and 718 are included in the 2001 song "Area Codes" as two of the many locations where rapper Ludacris has "hoes".

A telephone number in area code 347 appears as "Come forth and call 489-4608, and I'll be here" in the lyrics of "Diary", a track on the album The Diary of Alicia Keys.

In 2023, as part of the marketing for the then-upcoming release of The Super Mario Bros. Movie, a phone number with a (929) area code was created to call or text. When called, the number would play a pre-recorded message instructing callers to text the number. When texted, users would receive a link where they could sign up for updates related to the movie.

See also
List of New York area codes
List of NANP area codes
North American Numbering Plan

References

718
718
Communications in New York City